Morton Valley is an Unincorporated community in  Eastland County, Texas, United States.  It lies on SH-112,  North of Eastland.

History

Morton Valley is a ranching community with ruins of an old school house.

References

Unincorporated communities in Eastland County, Texas
Unincorporated communities in Texas